"Bitter is Better" is a song by British singer Kim Wilde, first recorded in 1981.

In 1982, it was used in support of a Japanese commercial for the B&L Bitter Lemon brand, and was subsequently released in that country as a single. It was also an extra track on the Japanese release of Wilde's second album, Select.

The song remained unreleased in any other country until 1984 when it was released as a single in France in support of The Very Best of Kim Wilde compilation (even though the track itself was not on that album). It later appeared on a French-issued compilation entitled Top 16 and for many years was considered a rarity. It finally gained Europe-wide release in 2006 as part of the compilation The Hits Collection. This also marked the first occasion the track appeared on the CD format.

References 

1982 singles
Kim Wilde songs
1981 songs